Yutu may refer to:

Vehicles
 Yutu (rover), a Chinese lunar rover 
 Yutu-1, the rover on Chang'e-3
 Yutu-2, the rover on Chang'e-4

Mythology
 Jade rabbit or Yùtù, a rabbit in East Asian folklore that lives on the Moon
 Youdu or Yutu, the capital of the underworld in Chinese mythology

Places
 Yutu Linea, a geographic feature on Pluto
 Coalsack Dark Nebula, or Yutu, a partridge shaped nebula

Other uses
 Tropical Storm/Typhoon Yutu, see List of tropical storms named Yutu

See also

 
 
 
 Tu Yu
 Yu (disambiguation)
 Tu (disambiguation)